In German military tradition, a Wachregiment ("guard regiment") is a regiment that also performs guard of honor duties. It is not to be confused with a Guards unit in Soviet military tradition.

Wachregimente include:
 Wachregiment Berlin (Weimar Republic)
 Wachregiment "Feliks E. Dzierzynski" (East Germany)
 Wachregiment "Friedrich Engels" (WR-1) (East Germany)
 Wachregiment "Hugo Eberlein" (WR-2) (East Germany)

See also
 Wachbataillon - the West German and later unified Germany equivalent.